Glenada is an unincorporated community in Lane County, Oregon, United States, across the Siuslaw River from the city of Florence on U.S. Route 101.

History
Glenada was incorporated in 1912 and disincorporated in 1922, after the town's sawmills burned. Glenada was platted by George Huestis Colter (Coulter) in 1889. Colter purchased an unbroken mile of river frontage and combined the names of his wife, Jane Ada Grant, and youngest daughter, Ada Colter, to name the town of Glen-ada in their honor.  The United States Postal Service condensed the name to Glenada.

The Glenada Hotel was built to accommodate travelers and also housed the Colter family, costing $4,000 to build.

George Huestis Colter was born on June 12, 1854, in Nova Scotia to Daniel and Almira (Huestis) Colter, the former a native of County Sligo, Ireland, and the latter of Nova Scotia.  George left Nova Scotia in 1869 and settled in San Francisco, California. Colter is buried in the Glenada Odd Fellows Cemetery, to which he donated the land and in which family plots were reserved. However, only one grandson, Dean Colter, who drowned, is buried next to him.

References

External links
Photo of Glenada Road and a hotel next to it.
Glenada Odd Fellows Cemetery Association

Oregon Coast
Former cities in Oregon
Unincorporated communities in Lane County, Oregon
1912 establishments in Oregon
1922 disestablishments in Oregon
Unincorporated communities in Oregon
Populated places established in 1912